William Tharp Cunningham (August 21, 1871 – February 7, 1952) was an American judge and politician. He served as a Democratic member of the Louisiana House of Representatives.

Life and career 
Cunningham was born in Natchitoches Parish, Louisiana, the son of Thalia and Milton Joseph Cunningham, a politician.

In 1908, Cunningham was elected to the Louisiana House of Representatives, serving until 1912. He was a judge for Louisiana's 11th Judicial District Court.

Cunningham died in February 1952 in Natchitoches Parish, Louisiana, at the age of 80.

References 

1871 births
1952 deaths
People from Natchitoches Parish, Louisiana
Democratic Party members of the Louisiana House of Representatives
20th-century American politicians
Louisiana state court judges
20th-century American judges